The 2018/19 FIS Nordic Combined World Cup was the 36th World Cup season, organized by the International Ski Federation. It started on 24 November 2018 in Ruka, Finland and concluded on 17 March 2019 in Schonach, Germany.

Calendar

Men

Men's team

Standings

Overall

Best Jumper Trophy

Best Skier Trophy

Nations Cup

Prize money

Achievements 

First World Cup career victory
 , 25, in his 7th season – the WC 1 in Ruka; first podium was 2016–17 in PyeongChang
 , 21, in his 4th season – the WC 10 in Val di Fiemme; first podium was 2016–17 in Ramsau
 , 25, in his 7th season – the WC 11 in Chaux-Neuve; first podium was the WC2 in Lillehammer

First World Cup podium
 , 25, in his 7th season – no. 3 in the WC 2 in Lillehammer
 , 24, in his 7th season – no. 3 in the WC 7 in Otepää
 , 25, in his 7th season – no. 2 in the WC 20 in Schonach

Victories in this World Cup (in brackets victory for all time)
 , 12 (13) first places
 , 2 (6) first places
 , 2 (2) first places
 , 2 (2) first places
 , 1 (17) first place
 , 1 (7) first place
 , 1 (1) first place

Retirements 

Following are notable Nordic combined skiers who announced their retirement:

References 

2018 in Nordic combined
2019 in Nordic combined
FIS Nordic Combined World Cup